Miss Universe Canada 2017, the 15th Miss Universe Canada pageant, was held on October 7, 2017 at John Bassett Theatre, Metro Toronto Convention Centre, Toronto, Ontario. Siera Bearchell of Saskatchewan Province crowned Lauren Howe of Ontario Province at the end of the event. Lauren represented Canada in the Miss Universe 2017 pageant on November 26, 2017, placing in the top 10.

Final results

Special Awards

Official Delegates
Meet the national delegates competing for the title of Miss Universe Canada 2017:

Crossovers and Returnees
Contestants who previously competed in the previous editions of Miss Universe Canada, in other local beauty pageants or in international reality modeling competition.:

Miss Universe Canada
2013: Katherine Highgate
2016: Katherine Jarzecki
2013: Kathryn Kohut
2015: Kathryn Kohut (2nd Runner-up)
2014: Lauren Howe (2nd Runner-up)
2012: Mina Khtaria
2014: Mina Khtaria
2015: Vanessa Chauhan
2016: Vanessa Chauhan (Top 20)
2016: Sasha Lombardi
2018: Marta Stepien (Winner)

Miss World Canada
2014: Kaylee Sheppard
2017: Rachel Miller

Miss Earth Canada
2013: Regina Semira
2014: Kaylee Shallow

Binibining Pilipinas
2015: Justine Beatrice Felizarta (Top 15)
2021: Justine Beatrice Felizarta (TBA)

Mutya ng Pilipinas
2012: Regina Semira

Miss Haiti
2019: Gabriela Clesca Vallejo (Winner)

Miss Supranational
2014: Gabriela Clesca Vallejo (Top 20)

Miss Grand International
2014: Kathryn Kohut (2nd Runner-up)
2014: Kaylee Shallow (represented St. Vincent & the Grenadines)

References

External links
Official Website

2017
2017 in Toronto
2017 beauty pageants